Tsiombe District is a district in the Androy Region, located in southeastern Madagascar.

Communes
The district is further divided into five communes:

 Antaritarika
 Faux Cap
 Imongy
 Marovato
 Tsiombe

References 

Districts of Androy